The Mercedes-Benz OM668 engine is a  diesel inline-four engine manufactured by the Mercedes-Benz division of Daimler AG. It was used in the Mercedes-Benz  W168 from 1997 to 2004 and the Mercedes-Benz W414 from 2001 to 2005.

Description 

The OM 668 makes use of the common rail system. Compared to the otto engine M 166 it has 4 valves per cylinder instead of two. Two chain driven overhead camshafts are used. The intake camshaft is driven by a chain, the exhaust camshaft is connected to the intake camshaft with a gear. Another chain drives the oil pump from the crankshaft. All engines have a turbocharger and all engines with more than  power also have an intercooler. In 1997 the OM 668 was the smallest diesel engine by Mercedes-Benz.

There are no mechanical differences between the engines, except from the  engine, which does not have an intercooler. In 2001, the camshaft and turbocharger were modified slightly. This increased the rated power, but not the torque, due to the weak clutch of the Mercedes-Benz W 168.

Without any physical changes to the engine, the power can be increased to  only by changing the software of the ECU. This does not decrease the durability of the robust engine.

Models 

*OM = Oelmotor (diesel engine),668 = engine series, DE = Direkteinspritzung (common rail injection), 17 = approximate Displacement in dl,A = Abgasturbolader (turbocharger),L = Ladeluftkühler (intercooler),red. = reduced power

Other applications
The OM668 is the basis for the Thielert Centurion 1.7 aircraft engine and for the engine of concept car Rinspeed Presto.

See also
 List of Mercedes-Benz engines

Sources 

A-Klasse manual (MOPF 2001)
Technical data
W 168/OM 668 on Elchfans.de

OM668
Diesel engines by model
Straight-four engines